Since inception in 1992 there have been 50 clubs who have played in the Premier League. Seven clubs have won the Premier League: Manchester United (13 times), Manchester City (six times), Chelsea (five times), Arsenal (three times), Blackburn Rovers (once), Leicester City (once) and Liverpool (once).

Record of finishing positions of clubs in the Premier League

Table correct as at the end of the 2021–22 Premier League season.

Team names in bold indicate the club is a current Premier League member

See also

 Performance Record and Ranking of Premier League Clubs According to Best Result in the UEFA Champions League
 UEFA Champions League clubs performance comparison
 List of English football champions
 Football records in England

References

Premier League records and statistics
Premier League lists

Association football comparisons